Majin District is a district (bakhsh) in Darreh Shahr County, Ilam Province, Iran. At the 2006 census, its population was 4,885, with 929 families.  The District has one city Mirza Hoseynabad.  The District has two rural districts (dehestan): Kulkani Rural District and Majin Rural District.

References 

Districts of Ilam Province
Darreh Shahr County